The United States Embassy in Poland is situated on Ujazdów Avenue in Warsaw, Poland.

During World War II, the United States kept relations with the Polish government-in-exile. The U.S. Embassy in Warsaw was reestablished on July 5, 1945, the same day on which the embassy in London was closed. Ambassador Arthur Bliss Lane was in charge of the embassy pending his presentation of credentials.

The United States also maintains a consulate in Kraków.

See also 
 United States Ambassador to Poland

References

External links 
 https://pl.usembassy.gov/
 

Warsaw
United States
Buildings and structures in Warsaw
Poland–United States relations